"Super Freak" is a 1981 single produced and performed by American singer Rick James. The song, co-written by James and Alonzo Miller, was first released on James' fifth album, Street Songs (1981) and became one of James' signature songs. "Freak" is a slang term for the sexually adventurous, as described in the song's lyrics, "She's a very kinky girl / The kind you don't take home to mother". Rolling Stone magazine ranked the song number 477 in its list of the 500 Greatest Songs of All Time in 2004, number 481 in 2010, and number 153 in an updated list in 2021. The song was nominated for the Grammy for Best Male Rock Vocal Performance at the 1982 Grammys. The song has been sampled by MC Hammer in 1990, the Black Eyed Peas in 2020, and by Nicki Minaj in 2022.

Recording
"Super Freak" was recorded with other tracks for the Street Songs album during December 1980 – January 1981 at the Record Plant, in Sausalito, California and Motown / Hitsville U.S.A. Recording Studios, Hollywood, California. It features background vocals from James' Motown labelmates the Temptations—in which the bassist was Greg "Big Money" Brown, Melvin Franklin—and Canadian singer Taborah Johnson. The tenor saxophone solo is by Stone City Band member Daniel LeMelle. James' improvised lyrics were later toned down by Los Angeles DJ Alonzo Miller, who received co-writing credit. James apparently was not particularly excited about the song, but reputedly wanted to have something on the album that "white folks could dance to."

Charts

Weekly charts

Year-end charts

Certifications

Beatfreakz version

In 2006, Dutch music group Beatfreakz covered the song as "Superfreak" and released it as a single. This cover reached number seven on the UK Singles Chart and number six in Finland and Hungary.

Track listings

Dutch CD single
"Superfreak" (radio edit)
"Superfreak" (club mix)
"Superfreak" (Fonzerelli remix)
"Superfreak" (Dennis Christopher De-Electro remix)
"Streetgirl" (album version)

UK 12-inch single
A1. "Superfreak" (Beatfreakz club mix)
A2. "Superfreak" (Fonzerelli remix)
B1. "Superfreak" (Dennis Christopher De-Electro remix)
B2. "Superfreak" (Friday Night Posse remix)

UK CD1
"Superfreak" (radio edit)
"Superfreak" (Beatfreakz club mix)

UK CD2
"Superfreak" (radio edit)
"Superfreak" (Fonzerelli remix)
"Superfreak" (Dennis Christopher De-Electro remix)
"Superfreak" (Verdez remix)
Extended interactive CD-ROM

Credits and personnel
Credits are lifted from the Dutch and UK CD1 liner notes.

Studios
Recorded at Beatfreakz Studios (Weesp, Netherlands)
Sample replays recorded at Scorccio.com Studio (Barcelona, Spain)

Personnel
Rick James, Alonzo Miller – writing
Sandro – vocals
Jassy Tamar Husk – additional vocals
Beatfreakz – production
Hal Ritson – vocal production
Mark Summers – sample replay production
Ben Cook – executive production
Dipesh Parmar – executive production assistant
Antonio Petronzio – photography

Charts

Weekly charts

Year-end charts

Release history

Sampling
The predominant riff of the song was most popularly sampled in 1990 by MC Hammer in "U Can't Touch This". The song would then be sampled by American musical group Black Eyed Peas in their 2020 single “Vida Loca", and was later sampled by Nicki Minaj in her 2022 single,  "Super Freaky Girl". Minaj previously appeared in the remix of Big Sean's "Dance (A$$)" (2011), which sampled "U Can't Touch This".

See also
List of number-one dance singles of 1981 (U.S.)

References

External links
Super Freak at Discogs

1981 songs
1981 singles
2006 singles
American new wave songs
Gordy Records singles
Data Records singles
Rick James songs
Songs written by Rick James
Song recordings produced by Rick James
Spinnin' Records singles
Songs about BDSM